The 2010–11 season of the Hoofdklasse was competed in six leagues, three Saturday leagues and three Sunday leagues. The Champions of each group promoted direct to the Topklasse.

League tables

Saturday A

Championship

Saturday B

Saturday C

Sunday A

Sunday B

Sunday C

Promotion playoffs

Round 1

Saturday A

Saturday B

Saturday C

Sunday A

Sunday B

Sunday C

Round 2

Saturday

Sunday

Round 3

Sunday

Saturday 

WKE and Montfoort will play in 2011–12 Topklasse.

Promotion/relegation play-off Hoofdklasse – Eerste Klasse

Saturday 
The teams ranked 11th and 12th of each of the 3 Saturday leagues (6 teams) and the 3 period winners of each of the 5 Saturday Eerste Klasse leagues (15 teams), making a total of 21 teams are grouped in 7 groups of 3 teams in  such a way that the Hoofdklasse teams each end up in a different group. In each group the 3 teams play a mini-competition.
The 7 group winners will play next season in the 2011–12 Hoofdklasse and the remaining teams in the 2011–12 Eerste klasse.

Group 1

Group 2

Groep 3

Groep 4

Group 5

Group 6

Group 7

Sunday 
The teams ranked 11th and 12th of each of the 3 Sunday leagues (6 teams) and the 3 period winners of each of the 6 Sunday Eerste Klasse leagues (18 teams), making a total of 24 teams, play in a 2-round 2 leg knockout system in such a way that the Hoofdklasse teams can never meet each other.
The 6 winners of the second round matches will play next season in the 2011–12 Hoofdklasse and the remaining teams in the 2011–12 Eerste klasse.

Sources:

References 

 soccerway.com
 www.knvb.nl

Vierde Divisie seasons
Neth
4